Glyphipterix forsterella is a moth of the  family Glyphipterigidae. It is found from most of Europe (except most of the Balkan Peninsula, Portugal and Ukraine), east to Japan.

The forewings are  rather broad, dark bronzy - fuscous ; five white streaks from posterior half of costa, second becoming silvery-metallic and reaching beyond middle ; a broader slightly curved oblique white mark from middle of dorsum, reaching half across wing a short white mark before tornus ; two or three silvery-metallic dots about tornus; a black apical spot enclosing a silvery- metallic dot ; dark line of cilia indented below apex ; a dark hook above apex. Hindwings are grey.

Adults are on wing from May to June and feed on the flowers of the larval host plant. There is one generation per year.

The larvae feed on the seeds of Carex species, including Carex vulpina and Carex remota. The species overwinters in the larval stage within the spikes of the host plant.

Subspecies
Glyphipterix forsterella forsterella
Glyphipterix forsterella albimaculella von Heinemann, 1876 (Central Europe)
Glyphipterix forsterella nivicaput Diakonoff, 1979 (Japan: Honshu)

References

Moths described in 1781
Glyphipterigidae
Moths of Asia
Moths of Europe